2014 K League may refer to:

 2014 K League Classic (1st Division)
 2014 K League Challenge (2nd Division)